The Junta of National Reconstruction (Junta de Gobierno de Reconstrucción Nacional) was the provisional government of Nicaragua from the fall of the Somoza dictatorship in July 1979 until January 1985, with the election of Sandinista National Liberation Front’s Daniel Ortega as president.

Overview
The Sandinista rebels announced the Junta as its provisional government on June 16, 1979, as the civil war against Anastasio Somoza Debayle entered its final phase. It was composed of five members: a member of the FSLN directorate, Daniel Ortega, two left-wing activists, Sergio Ramírez and Moisés Hassan Morales, and two right-wing representatives, Alfonso Robelo and Violeta Barrios de Chamorro.

In the first half of July, United States government envoy William Bowdler pressured the Sandinistas to broaden the junta by adding more members, such as Adolfo Calero, Ismael Reyes, and Mariano Fiallos.

After the fall of Somoza, it quickly became apparent to Robelo and Chamorro that they did not have any real power and Chamorro resigned on April 19, 1980, followed by Robelo three days later. On May 18, they were replaced by Arturo Cruz and Rafael Córdova Rivas. Cruz would resign in March 1981, though he agreed for a time to be ambassador to the United States.

On March 4, Cruz's appointment to Washington was announced, together with Hassan's departure for the Council of State and Ortega's promotion to Coordinator of the now three-member junta. While the junta may have offered little authority to its non-Sandinista members, the public role did help to solidify Ortega's primacy within the FSLN directorate and enhance Ramírez's prominence.

On November 4, 1984, a presidential election was held, which was won by leading junta member and revolutionary Daniel Ortega and his running mate, Sergio Ramírez as vice president. However, some opposition parties boycotted it, claiming unfair conditions. While the Reagan administration and many mainstream United States media outlets alleged the election would be neither free nor fair, numerous electoral watchers affiliated with Western European governments, as well as United States non-governmental organizations, declared the results legitimate. Ortega took office on January 10, 1985, and the junta was dissolved.

See also 
 Sandinista National Liberation Front
 Fidel Castro

References

External links 

Sandinista National Liberation Front
Political history of Nicaragua
Provisional governments
Nicaraguan Revolution
Former socialist republics